Shabran is a city in and the capital of the Shabran District of Azerbaijan.

History
Known as Davachi until 2010, Shabran received city status in 1961. The name of Shabran comes from an historic medieval town of the same name that was a port some 15km further north.

Demographics 
The officially registered population of Shabran in 2010 was 23,248. Azerbaijanis and Tats are the largest ethnic groups.

Geography

Culture

Transport

Education

Notable residents

References

External links

Populated places in Shabran District